Gustav Georg Zeltner (16 September 1672, in Hiltpoltstein – 20 July 1738, in Poppenreuth) was a Lutheran theologian. Zeltner wrote numerous theological and historical writings.

Life 
From 1689 to 1694 he studied philosophy and theology at the University of Jena. In 1695 he assumed the position of inspector of the alumni in Altdorf. In 1698 he moved to Nuremberg and worked as a vicar and as a professor of metaphysics at the Aegidianum. Two years later he was appointed deacon at St. Sebaldus Church, Nuremberg.

During his time in Nuremberg, Zeltner get his doctorate in theology and returned to Altdorf in 1706 to teach theology and oriental studies at the local university. In 1730 he was accepted as an external member of the Prussian Academy of Sciences.

Zeltner spent his retirement in Poppenreuth, where he held the position of pastor from 1730 until his death.

Works 
 
 Deborae inter prophetissas eruditio tanquam eruditarum foeminarum ex Hebraea gente specimen, 1708 
 De erudita virgine Iudaea per transennam docente. Altdorf 1717
 Vitae theologorum Altorphinorum a condita Academia, 1722

 Historia Crypto-Socinismi Altorfinae quondam Academiae infesti arcana, 2 Bde., 1729

Literature

External links 

 
 
 Digitalisierte Drucke von Zeltner in der Post-Reformation Digital Library

1672 births
1738 deaths
Members of the Prussian Academy of Sciences